John Hill (born November 26, 1960) is an American former ice hockey coach. Through his career he worked mostly at the collegiate level for several schools over more than 20 years.

Head coaching record

College

References

External links

1960 births
Living people
Alaska Anchorage Seawolves men's ice hockey coaches
Alaska Anchorage Seawolves men's ice hockey players
American ice hockey coaches
Columbus Blue Jackets scouts
Edmonton Oilers scouts
Ice hockey people from Virginia
Sportspeople from Hampton, Virginia